Kimari  is a village development committee in Mugu District in the Karnali Zone of north-western Nepal. At the time of the 1991 Nepal census it had a population of 743 people living in 131 individual households. Most of the people are named "The Herro" or "Kimawi.

References

External links
UN map of the municipalities of Mugu District

Populated places in Mugu District